European Neurology is a monthly peer-reviewed medical journal covering neurology. It was established in 1968 and is published by Karger Publishers. The editor-in-chief is Julien Bogousslavsky. According to the Journal Citation Reports, the journal has a 2014 impact factor of 1.356.

History 
The history of European Neurology dates back to 1897, when the Monatsschrift für Psychiatrie und Neurologie was established. This journal changed its name to Psychiatria et Neurologia in 1957. In 1968, it was split into two journals: European Neurology and Psychiatria Clinica.

References

External links 

Neurology journals
Karger academic journals
Publications established in 1968
English-language journals
Monthly journals